Reichenbach is a village and a cadastral municipality of Litschau, a town in the district of Gmünd in Lower Austria, Austria.

Housing Development 
At the turn of 1979/1980 there was a total of 20 building plots with 12.073 m² and 19 gardens with 8.481 m², 1989/1990 there were 29 buildings plots. At the turn of 1999/2000, the number of buildings plots had increased to 79 and at the turn of 2009/2010 there were 34 buildings on 64 building plots.

References 

Cities and towns in Gmünd District
Cadastral community of Austria